This article lists the highest natural elevation of each sovereign state on the continent of Asia defined physiographically. States sometimes associated with Asia politically and culturally, but not geographically part of Asia, are not included in this list of physical features (with the exception of Cyprus - marked with a N/A rank entry).

Not all points in this list are mountains or hills, some are simply elevations that are not distinguishable as geographical features.

Notes are provided where territorial disputes or inconsistencies affect the listings. Some countries such as Azerbaijan, Georgia, and Russia (Elbrus) have part of their territory and their high points outside of Asia; their non-Asian high points are listed with a N/A rank entry underneath their continental peak.

Three other entries of partially recognized countries with highest points in Asia are listed and ranked in Italic. For more details see List of states with limited recognition.

Notes

See also
List of elevation extremes by country
Geography of Asia
Lists of mountains by region#Asia – a list of Asian mountain lists
Extreme points of Asia
List of highest points of African countries
List of highest points of European countries
List of highest points of Oceanian countries

References
CIA World Factbook

Geography of Asia